Petro Petrovych Kharzhevskyi (born 3 January 2000) is a Ukrainian professional footballer who plays as a right-back for Mariupol.

Career
Kharzhevskyi is a product of the FC Karpaty Lviv School Sportive System.

He made his debut for FC Karpaty as the substituted player in the winning host match against FC Vorskla Poltava on 4 April 2019 in the Ukrainian Premier League.

References

External links
 
 

2000 births
Living people
People from Ladyzhyn
Ukrainian footballers
Association football defenders
Ukraine youth international footballers
FC Karpaty Lviv players
FC Rukh Lviv players
FC Yarud Mariupol players
Ukrainian Premier League players
Ukrainian First League players
Sportspeople from Vinnytsia Oblast